Love Drunk is a 2009 album by Boys Like Girls.

Love Drunk may also refer to:

 "Love Drunk" (Boys Like Girls song), 2009 song by Boys Like Girls
 "Love Drunk" (Loick Essien song), 2010 song by Loick Essien
 Love sickness
 Love addiction
 "Love Drunk", a song by Little Mix from DNA
"Love Drunk", a song by Charlotte Church from Back to Scratch

See also
 Drunk Love, 2006 EP by The Cab
 "Drunk on Love"
 Punch-Drunk Love, 2002 film